Mario Robbe (born 23 August 1973 in Tilburg) is a Dutch professional darts player.

Career

Robbe made his BDO World Darts Championship debut in 2007, where he lost in the first round to Ted Hankey. He returned to Lakeside in 2008, but lost again in the first round to fellow Dutchman Remco van Eijden.

World Championship Results

BDO

 2007: 1st Round (lost to Ted Hankey 0-3)
 2008: 1st Round (lost to Remco van Eijden 1-3)

External links
Profile and stats on Darts Database

1973 births
Living people
Dutch darts players
Professional Darts Corporation former tour card holders
Sportspeople from Tilburg
British Darts Organisation players